Jhok Mehar Shah is a village in Union council Punjgirain Nashaib, Darya Khan Tehsil, Bhakkar District, Punjab, Pakistan.

It was named for Syed Mehar Shah, one of three villages in the district named for three brothers: Jhok Mehar Shah, Jhok Qalander Shah and Jhok Laal Shah.

Population of Jhok Mehar Shah is 2,298 according to the census 2017.

There is a Great Mosque Jafria, and a government primary school for boys.

The main ethnic groups of the village are Kumhar, Syed, Noon, Jhunj, Gorai, Babhan, Macchi, Dirkhan, and Muhana.

References

https://www.politicpk.com/bhakkar-district-population-of-cities-towns-and-villages-2017-2018/amp/

Villages in Bhakkar District